, short for argumentum ad hominem, is a term that refers to several types of arguments, most of which are fallacious. Typically this term refers to a rhetorical strategy where the speaker attacks the character, motive, or some other attribute of the person making an argument rather than attacking the substance of the argument itself. This avoids genuine debate by creating a diversion to some irrelevant but often highly charged issue. The most common form of this fallacy is "A makes a claim x, B asserts that A holds a property that is unwelcome, and hence B concludes that argument x is wrong".

The valid types of ad hominem arguments are generally only encountered in specialized philosophical usage. These typically refer to the dialectical strategy of using the target's own beliefs and arguments against them, while not agreeing with the validity of those beliefs and arguments. Ad hominem arguments were first studied in ancient Greece; John Locke revived the examination of ad hominem arguments in the 17th century. Many contemporary politicians routinely use ad hominem attacks, which can be encapsulated to a derogatory nickname for a political opponent.

History 

The various types of ad hominem arguments have been known in the West since at least the ancient Greeks. Aristotle, in his work Sophistical Refutations, detailed the fallaciousness of putting the questioner but not the argument under scrutiny. Many examples of ancient non-fallacious ad hominem arguments are preserved in the works of the Pyrrhonist philosopher Sextus Empiricus. In these arguments, the concepts and assumptions of the opponents are used as part of a dialectical strategy against the opponents to demonstrate the unsoundness of their own arguments and assumptions. In this way, the arguments are to the person (ad hominem), but without attacking the properties of the individuals making the arguments. This kind of argument is also known as "argument from commitment".

Italian polymath Galileo Galilei and British philosopher John Locke also examined the argument from commitment, a form of the ad hominem argument, meaning examining an argument on the basis of whether it stands true to the principles of the person carrying the argument. In the mid-19th century, the modern understanding of the term ad hominem started to take shape, with the broad definition given by English logician Richard Whately. According to Whately, ad hominem arguments were "addressed to the peculiar circumstances, character, avowed opinions, or past conduct of the individual".

Over time, the term acquired a different meaning; by the beginning of the 20th century, it was linked to a logical fallacy, in which a debater, instead of disproving an argument, attacked their opponent. This approach was also popularized in philosophical textbooks of the mid-20th century, and it was challenged by Australian philosopher Charles Leonard Hamblin in the second half of the 20th century. In a detailed work, he suggested that the inclusion of a statement against a person in an argument does not necessarily make it a fallacious argument since that particular phrase is not a premise that leads to a conclusion. While Hablin's criticism was not widely accepted, Canadian philosopher Douglas N. Walton examined the fallaciousness of the ad hominem argument even further. Nowadays, except within specialized philosophical usages, the usage of the term ad hominem signifies a straight attack at the character and ethos of a person, in an attempt to refute their argument.

Terminology 

The Latin phase argumentum ad hominem stands for "argument against the person". "Ad" corresponds to "against" but it could also mean "to" or "towards".

The terms ad mulierem and ad feminam have been used specifically when the person receiving the criticism is female.

Types of ad hominem arguments 

Fallacious ad hominem reasoning is categorized  among informal fallacies, more precisely as a genetic fallacy, a subcategory of fallacies of irrelevance.

Ad hominem fallacies can be separated in various different types, among others are tu quoque, circumstantial, guilt by association, and abusive ad hominem. All of them are similar to the general scheme of ad hominem argument, that is instead of dealing with the essence of someone's argument or trying to refute it, the interlocutor is attacking the character of the proponent of the argument and concluding that it is a sufficient reason to drop the initial argument.

Tu quoque 

Ad hominem tu quoque (literally: "You also") is a response to a personal attack (or ad hominem argument) that itself is a personal attack.

Tu quoque appears as: 
A makes a claim a.
B attacks the character of A by saying they hold a property x, which is bad.
A defends themself by attacking B, saying they also hold the same property x.

Here is an example given by philosophy professor George Wrisley to illustrate the above: A businessman and politician is giving a lecture at a University about how good his company is and how nicely the system works. A student asks him "Is it true that you and your company are selling weapons to third world rulers who use those arms against their own people?" and the  businessman replies "is it true that your university gets funding by the same company that you are claiming is selling guns to those countries? You are not a white dove either". The ad hominem accusation of the student is relevant to the narrative the businessman tries to project thus not fallacious. On the other hand, the attack on the student (that is, the student being inconsistent) is irrelevant to the opening narrative. So the businessman's tu quoque response is fallacious.

Canadian philosopher Christopher Tindale approaches somewhat different the tu quoque fallacy. According to Tindale, a tu quoque fallacy appears when a response to an argument is made on the history of the arguer. This argument is also invalid because it does not disprove the premise; if the premise is true, then source A may be a hypocrite or even changed their mind, but this does not make the statement less credible from a logical perspective. A common example, given by Tindale, is when a doctor advises a patient to lose weight, but the patient argues that there is no need for him to go on a diet because the doctor is also overweight.

Circumstantial 

Circumstantial ad hominem points out that someone is in circumstances (for instance, their job, wealth, property, or relations) such that they are disposed to take a particular position. It constitutes an attack on the bias of a source. As with other types of ad hominem attack, circumstantial attack could be fallacious or not. It could be fallacious because a disposition to make a certain argument does not make the argument invalid; this overlaps with the genetic fallacy (an argument that a claim is incorrect due to its source). But it also may be a sound argument, if the premises are correct and the bias is relevant to the argument.

A simple example is: a father may tell his daughter not to start smoking because she will damage her health, and she may point out that he is or was a smoker. This does not alter the fact that smoking might cause various diseases. Her father's inconsistency is not a proper reason to reject his claim.

Philosopher and pundit on informal fallacies Douglas N. Walton argues that a circumstantial ad hominem argument can be non-fallacious. This could be the case when someone (A) attacks the personality of another person (B), making an argument (a) while the personality of B is relevant to argument a, i.e. B talks as an authority figure. To illustrate this reasoning, Walton gives the example of a witness at a trial: if he had been caught lying and cheating in his own life, should the jury take his word for granted? No, according to Walton.

Guilt by association 

Guilt by association, that is accusing an arguer because of his alleged connection with a discredited person or group, can sometimes also be a type of ad hominem fallacy when the argument attacks a source because of the similarity between the views of someone making an argument and other proponents of the argument.

This form of the argument is as follows:
 Individual S makes claim C. 
 Individual S is also associated with Group G, who has an unfavorable reputation
 Therefore, individual S and his views are questionable.

Academic Leigh Kolb gives as an example that the 2008 US vice‐presidential candidate Sarah Palin attacked Barack Obama for having worked with Bill Ayers, who had been a leader in the Weather Underground terrorist group in the 1960s. Despite Obama denouncing every act of terrorism, he was still associated by his opponents with terrorism.

Guilt by association is frequently found in social and political debates. It also appears after major events (such as scandals and terrorism) linked to a specific group. An example, given also by Leigh Kolb, is the peak of attacks against Muslims in the US after the September 11 attacks.

Abusive ad hominem

Abusive ad hominem argument (or direct ad hominem) is associated with an attack to the character of the person carrying an argument. This kind of argument, besides usually being fallacious, is also counterproductive, as a proper dialogue is hard to achieve after such an attack.

Key issues in examining an argument to determine whether it is an ad hominem fallacy or not are whether the accusation against the person stands true or not, and whether the accusation is relevant to the argument. An example is a dialogue at the court, where the attorney cross-examines an eyewitness, bringing to light the fact that the witness was convicted in the past for lying. If the attorney's conclusion is that the witness is lying, that would be wrong. But if his argument would be that the witness should not be trusted, that would not be a fallacy.

Argument from commitment 
An ad hominem argument from commitment is a type of valid argument that employs, as a dialectical strategy, the exclusive utilization of the beliefs, convictions, and assumptions of those holding the position being argued against, i.e., arguments constructed on the basis of what other people hold to be true. This usage is generally only encountered in specialist philosophical usage or in pre-20th century usages. This type of argument is also known as the ex concessis argument (Latin for "from what has been conceded already").

Usage in debates
Ad hominem fallacies are considered to be uncivil and do not help creating a constructive atmosphere for dialogue to flourish. An ad hominem attack is an attack on the character of the target who tends to feel the necessity to defend himself or herself from the accusation of being hypocritical. Walton has noted that it is so powerful of an argument that it is employed in many political debates. Since it is associated with negativity and dirty tricks, it has gained a bad fame, of being always fallacious.

Author Eithan Orkibi, having studied the Israeli politics prior to elections, described two other forms of ad hominem attacks that are common during election periods. They both depend on the collective memory shared by both proponents and the audience. The first is the precedent ad hominem, according to which the previous history of someone means that they do not fit for the office. It goes like this: "My opponent was (allegedly) wrong in the past, therefore he is wrong now". The second one is a behavioral ad hominem: "my opponent was not decent in his arguments in the past, so he is not now either". These kinds of attacks are based on the inability of the audience to have a clear view of the amount of false statements by both parts of the debate.

Criticism as a fallacy 
Walton has argued that ad hominem reasoning is not always fallacious, and that in some instances, questions of personal conduct, character, motives, etc., are legitimate and relevant to the issue, as when it directly involves hypocrisy, or actions contradicting the subject's words.

The philosopher Charles Taylor has argued that ad hominem reasoning (discussing facts about the speaker or author relative to the value of his statements) is essential to understanding certain moral issues due to the connection between individual persons and morality (or moral claims), and contrasts this sort of reasoning with the apodictic reasoning (involving facts beyond dispute or clearly established) of philosophical naturalism.

See also 

 "And you are lynching Negroes"
 Appeal to authority
 Appeal to emotion
 Appeal to motive
 Character assassination
 Discrediting tactic
 Ergo decedo
 Fair Game (Scientology)
 Fake news
 Fundamental attribution error
 Gaslighting
 Hostile witness
 Negative campaigning
 Poisoning the well
 Presumption of guilt 
 Race card
 Red herring
 Reputation
 Shooting the messenger
 Smear campaign
 Straw man
 Tone policing
 The Art of Being Right
 Whataboutism

References

Sources

External links 

 
 Argumentum Ad Hominem

Genetic fallacies
Latin logical phrases
Latin words and phrases
Propaganda techniques
Pyrrhonism
Rhetoric
Informal fallacies